Mrs. Doubtfire is a 1993 American comedy-drama film directed by Chris Columbus.  It was written for the screen by Randi Mayem Singer and Leslie Dixon, based on the 1987 novel Alias Madame Doubtfire by Anne Fine. Robin Williams, who also served as a producer, stars with Sally Field, Pierce Brosnan, Harvey Fierstein, and Robert Prosky. It follows a recently divorced actor who dresses up as a female housekeeper to be able to interact with his children. The film addresses themes of divorce, separation, and the effect they have on a family.

The film was released in the United States by 20th Century Fox on November 24, 1993. It won the Academy Award for Best Makeup and the Golden Globe Award for Best Motion Picture – Musical or Comedy. Robin Williams was awarded the Golden Globe Award for Best Actor in a Motion Picture – Musical or Comedy.

It grossed $441.3 million on a $25 million budget, making it the second-highest-grossing film of 1993. Although the film received mixed reviews on release, its reception and popularity have since improved considerably, being placed 67th in the American Film Institute's "AFI's 100 Years...100 Laughs" list and 40th on Bravo's "100 Funniest Movies of All Time" list. The original music score was composed by Howard Shore.

Plot

Daniel Hillard is a freelance voice actor living in San Francisco. Though he is a devoted father to his three children—14-year-old Lydia, 12-year-old Christopher “Chris”, and 5-year-old Natalie—his wife Miranda, an architect, considers him unreliable. One day, Daniel quits his job following a disagreement over a morally questionable script and returns home to throw a chaotic birthday party for Chris, despite Miranda's objections due to Chris’s bad report card. This infuriates Miranda to the point where she files for divorce. At their first custody hearing, the court grants sole custody of the children to Miranda; shared custody is contingent on whether Daniel finds a steady job and a suitable residence within three months.

As Daniel works to rebuild his life, securing himself an apartment and a new job as a shipping clerk at a TV station, he learns that Miranda is seeking a housekeeper. Daniel secretly alters her classified ad form, then calls Miranda while using his voice acting skills to pose as a series of undesirable applicants. Daniel finally calls Miranda as "Mrs. Euphegenia Doubtfire", an elderly British nanny with strong credentials, taking his last name from a newspaper headline titled "Police Doubt Fire was Accidental". Miranda is impressed and invites Mrs. Doubtfire for an interview. Daniel asks his brother Frank, a makeup artist, and Frank's domestic partner, Jack, to create a Mrs. Doubtfire costume, including a prosthetic mask to make him appear as an old woman.

Miranda hires Mrs. Doubtfire following a successful interview. The children initially struggle under Mrs. Doubtfire's authority but soon come around and thrive and Miranda learns to become closer with her children. Daniel learns several household skills as part of the role, further improving himself. However, this later creates another barrier for him to see his children, as Miranda puts more trust in Mrs. Doubtfire than him and cannot bring herself to dismiss her. Lydia and Chris later discover that Mrs. Doubtfire is actually Daniel, but they agree to keep his secret.

One day, the station's CEO Jonathan Lundy sees Daniel playing with toy dinosaurs on the set of a recently canceled children's show. Impressed by his voice acting and imagination, Lundy invites Daniel to discuss his plans for the show over dinner, which turns out to be at the same place and time as a planned birthday dinner for Miranda by her new boyfriend Stu Dunmeyer, to which Mrs. Doubtfire is invited. Unable to change either appointment, Daniel changes in and out of the Mrs. Doubtfire costume to attend both events. Becoming drunk, Daniel slips up when he accidentally returns to Lundy in his costume, but Daniel quickly claims that Mrs. Doubtfire is his idea for the new show. After overhearing that Stu is allergic to pepper, Daniel sneaks into the kitchen and seasons Stu's order of jambalaya with powdered cayenne pepper. Stu chokes on his dinner, and Daniel, feeling guilty, administers the Heimlich maneuver as Mrs. Doubtfire. The action causes the prosthetic mask to partially peel off Daniel's face, revealing his identity and horrifying Miranda, who storms out of the restaurant with the kids. Stu however thanks Daniel for saving him.

At their next custody hearing, Daniel points out that he has met the judge's requirements, then explains his actions. The judge, noting Daniel's acting abilities, dismisses his words as another act and, finding his role as Mrs. Doubtfire unorthodox, grants Miranda full custody of the kids and further restricts Daniel's rights to supervised Saturday visits. This devastates him and Miranda, who begins to realize that her anger and resentment towards Daniel has been hurting the family. Without Mrs. Doubtfire, Miranda and the kids become miserable, acknowledging how much "she" improved their lives. They are then surprised to discover that Daniel, as Mrs. Doubtfire, is hosting a new children's show called Euphegenia's House, which becomes a nationwide hit.

Miranda visits Daniel on set after filming and admits that things were better when he was involved with the family. She then arranges joint custody, allowing Daniel as himself to take the children after school. As Daniel leaves with the kids, Miranda watches an episode of Euphegenia's House in which Mrs. Doubtfire answers a letter from a young girl named Katie McCormick, whose parents have separated, saying no matter what arrangements families have, love will prevail.

Cast
 Robin Williams as Daniel Hillard / Euphegenia Doubtfire
 Sally Field as Miranda Hillard
 Pierce Brosnan as Stuart "Stu" Dunmeyer
 Harvey Fierstein as Frank Hillard
 Polly Holliday as Gloria Chaney
 Lisa Jakub as Lydia Hillard
 Matthew Lawrence as Christopher "Chris" Hillard
 Mara Wilson as Natalie Hillard
 Robert Prosky as Jonathan Lundy
 Anne Haney as Mrs. Sellner
 Scott Capurro as Jack
 Martin Mull as Justin Gregory
 William Newman as Mr. Sprinkles

Casting

Blake Lively unsuccessfully auditioned for the role of Natalie Hilliard.

Warren Beatty was Anne Fine’s first choice for the role of Daniel Hillard / Mrs. Doubtfire.

Tim Allen was offered the roles of Daniel Hillard and Stu, but turned both of them down.

Production

Production of the film was in San Francisco. Various locations in the city were used during filming. Parts were filmed at the studios of television station KTVU in Oakland. Street signs for the intersection near the "Painted Lady" home, Steiner, and Broadway, were visible onscreen.

The exact address 2640 Steiner Street became a tourist attraction for some time after the film's release. Following Williams' death on August 11, 2014, the house became an impromptu memorial. All interior filming for the home took place in a Bay Area warehouse converted for sound stage usage. Williams' character, Daniel Hillard, lived upstairs from Danilo Bakery at 516 Green Street; his children attended a school at Filbert and Taylor.

The makeup for Mrs. Doubtfire's appearance took four hours to apply. Williams later recounted how he used to walk through San Francisco dressed in full makeup and costume as Mrs. Euphegenia Doubtfire, and on one occasion, visiting a sex shop to buy a large dildo and other toys. Director Chris Columbus stated in a 2015 interview that they shot with multiple cameras at once like shooting a documentary to capture the cast members' reaction to Williams' improvisation. The restaurant scene was filmed at Bridges Restaurant & Bar, in Danville, California.

The score was composed, orchestrated, and conducted by Howard Shore.

Release
The film was released in the United States on November 24, 1993 and was rated PG-13.

In January 1994, when released in the United Kingdom, the film received a certificate of 12 which, at the time, completely refused access to children under the age of 12 at cinemas (the 12A certificate did not exist until 2002). This resulted in cinemas requesting their local authorities to override the decision of the British Board of Film Classification, after having to turn down disappointed families. Later in February, The Independent reported that the censors refused to give the film a U or PG certificate, and gave it a 12 instead, which was due to 20th Century Fox refusing to remove three controversial lines.

After the film's distributors requested the BBFC to reconsider, a compromise was reached and the film was re-rated PG, with just one of the proposed three cuts implemented involving the removal of thirteen seconds featuring sexual innuendo (the other two cuts would have removed just some of the innuendo), and it was re-released in May 1994. The cut version was also used in subsequent VHS and DVD releases in the United Kingdom. In November 2012 the distributors resubmitted the uncut version to the BBFC and the 12 certificate was reinstated for home video along with a 12A certificate for cinema release in 2014. On March 4, 2013, the uncut version was released on Blu-ray and downloads in the United Kingdom.

In early 2021, several web articles claimed that there was an NC-17 cut of the film featuring extraordinary vulgar ad libs by Robin Williams. However the claim was later debunked by director Chris Columbus and star Mara Wilson, with Columbus stating that Williams did film enough outtakes to make an R rated version, but that an NC-17 rating was absurd. Wilson previously denied the claims of an NC-17 cut of the film in 2016 in her memoir Where Are They Now?: True Stories of Girlhood and Accidental Fame.

Deleted scenes
Over 30 minutes of scenes were omitted from the final cut of the film, some of which were featured in the 2008 DVD release of Mrs. Doubtfire called the "Behind-the-Seams Edition". Had the scenes been included, the film would have run for 157 minutes. These include an entire subplot featuring Daniel's conflict with his nosy neighbor Gloria Chaney (Polly Holliday) in which, after Daniel dresses as Mrs. Doubtfire, he fools Gloria into killing her flowers by spraying dog urine on them, and a final confrontation in which Gloria sees Daniel in his Mrs. Doubtfire bodycostume but without the face mask. There is also an extended scene at Bridges restaurant. In 2016, three scenes from the 2008 DVD release, which were also included in the aforementioned 2013 Blu-ray release, gained media attention to much fanfare and praise for Robin Williams. These included a scene where Daniel and Miranda fight at Lydia's spelling bee competition and a confrontation scene with Miranda after Daniel's identity is revealed at the restaurant. He recovers later and comes back home to the family.

Reception

Box office

The film earned $219,195,243 in the United States and Canada, and $222,090,952 in other countries, for a worldwide total of $441,286,195, making it Fox's highest-grossing film internationally at the time and the highest-grossing cross-dressing film. It became the second-highest-grossing film of 1993, behind only Jurassic Park. Box Office Mojo estimates that the film sold over 52.6 million tickets in the US. It had a record opening for Fox in the United Kingdom with $5.8 million in 6 days (and the third best in the country after Jurassic Park and Bram Stoker's Dracula) and went on to gross $30.1 million, a Fox record. It had the second biggest opening in Italy behind Jurassic Park with $2.9 million and also grossed a record for Fox in Italy with $15.6 million. It also had record openings for Fox in France (with an opening week gross of $4.8 million and a total of $23 million), Belgium, Hungary and Denmark. It grossed $29.6 million in Germany. The film was number one at the Australian box office and Japanese box office for nine consecutive weeks.

Critical reception
At the time of its release, several critics compared Mrs. Doubtfire unfavorably with Some Like It Hot (1959) and others who viewed the film favorably noted its similarity to Tootsie (1982). On Rotten Tomatoes, Mrs. Doubtfire has a rating of 70%, based on 54 reviews, with an average rating of 5.90/10. The site's critical reception reads: "On paper, Mrs. Doubtfire might seem excessively broad or sentimental, but Robin Williams shines so brightly in the title role that the end result is difficult to resist". On Metacritic, the film holds a score of 53 out of 100, based on 16 critics, indicating 'mixed or average reviews'. Audiences polled by CinemaScore gave the film an average grade of "A" on an A+ to F scale.

Accolades

In 2000, the American Film Institute placed the film on its 100 Years...100 Laughs list, where it was ranked #67.

Cancelled sequel
In 2001, Bonnie Hunt began to develop Mrs. Doubtfire 2. Anne Fine had not written a follow-up to Alias Madame Doubtfire, and writing for the sequel did not begin until 2003. Robin Williams was set to return in disguise as the eponymous Mrs. Doubtfire. Re-writing began in 2006 because Williams was unhappy with the plot in the new script. The film had been anticipated for release in late 2007, but following further script problems, the sequel was scrapped in December 2006.

In 2006, in an Newsday interview, Williams said the sequel was indefinitely scrapped, stating his reasons:

Also, in December that year, during an interview on BBC Radio 1 by DJ Edith Bowman, Williams said that if it was not going to be done right, then it was not worth doing, and that there would not be a sequel with him in it.

In August 2010, on Alan Carr: Chatty Man, Williams again brought up the topic of a sequel to Mrs. Doubtfire. He blamed the script not being right as the reason why a sequel was not made. He claimed the script had been written three times and failed, and there was no mention of any ongoing work on the project. Furthermore, in December 2011, during an interview by Moviehole, Williams stated again that the chances of a sequel are "highly unlikely".

In 2011, Williams said:

In 2014, Chris Columbus stated, in turn:

In April 2014, a sequel was announced to be in development at 20th Century Fox. Williams and Columbus were expected to return, and Elf screenwriter David Berenbaum was hired to write the script. Initial reception to the announcement was mixed, with some people fearing that the sequel will revive certain misgivings about the transgender community and set the LGBTQ awareness progress back two and a half decades, especially after a image of the character was used to mock the trans community at a medical insurance coverage reform in 2013. Matthew Lawrence, Lisa Jakub, and Pierce Brosnan had expressed interest in reprising their respective characters for the sequel. However, Mara Wilson, who played Natalie Hillard in the original film, expressed no interest in returning for the sequel. However, after Williams' death in August 2014, plans for a sequel were put on hold and then again cancelled.

In August 2014, shortly after Robin Williams' death, it was revealed that Williams had grown weary working on film sets because it tended to take him away from his family for extended periods of time and only signed on for the sequel "purely out of necessity." In August 2015, Chris Columbus revealed that the sequel came to be after someone came up with a very interesting idea, and that his conversation with Williams about the subject was the last time he ever talked to the actor. In December 2021, Columbus stated that a sequel is impossible without Robin Williams' involvement.

Stage adaptation 

Theatrical producer Kevin McCollum spoke in 2013 about the film's musical prospects, noting the plot was 'tailored for Broadway audiences'.  Following a 2015 plan going on hiatus, McCollum assembled a different creative team in 2018: Karey and Wayne Kirkpatrick composing the score, with John O'Farrell and Karey Kirkpatrick writing the book, and Tony Award-winner Jerry Zaks directing. The musical Mrs. Doubtfire premiered Seattle at the 5th Avenue Theatre on December 13, 2019. The production transferred to Broadway, with previews beginning March 9, 2020, at the Stephen Sondheim Theatre. All Broadway productions were suspended three days later due to the coronavirus pandemic. Eventually Mrs. Doubtfire resumed previews on October 21, 2021, and officially opened December 5, 2021.

See also
 Avvai Shanmughi, the 1996 Indian Tamil-language film that was inspired by Mrs. Doubtfire
 Chachi 420, the 1997 Indian Hindi-language remake of Avvai Shanmughi
 Cross-dressing in film and television
 Kauda Bole Alice, the 2000 Sri Lankan Sinhala-language remake

References

External links

 
 
 
 

1993 comedy-drama films
1990s American films
1990s English-language films
1990s legal films
1993 films
1993 LGBT-related films
20th Century Fox films
American comedy-drama films
American courtroom films
American legal films
American LGBT-related films
American screwball comedy films
Best Musical or Comedy Picture Golden Globe winners
Fiction about child care occupations
Comedy film characters
Cross-dressing in American films
Female characters in film
Films scored by Howard Shore
Films about actors
Films about divorce
Films about dysfunctional families
Films about nannies
Films adapted into plays
Films based on British novels
Films directed by Chris Columbus
Films featuring a Best Musical or Comedy Actor Golden Globe winning performance
Films set in San Francisco
Films shot in San Francisco
Films that won the Academy Award for Best Makeup
Films with screenplays by Leslie Dixon
LGBT-related comedy-drama films